The Jinan Public Trolleybus System serves the city of Jinan, in the province of Shandong, China. Opened in 1977, the system is operated by the Jinan Public Transport Corporation, and presently consists of four lines.

History
The first trolleybus route in Jinan, Route 1 was opened to public on 1 January 1977.  In the same year, Route 2 commenced operations.  The routes where renumbered to 101 and 102 in 1992. In the late 1990s, two more routes, Route 103 and 104, were opened.

Lines 

, the system was made up of the following lines:

Fleet 
Up to 2013, the only model of trolleybus used currently used in Jinan is the JK6120D, manufactured by China National Heavy Duty Truck Group, or Sinotruk, which is based in Jinan. Jinan also employed some second-hand SK561G articulated trolleybuses purchased from Luoyang. Those 1980s-models all retired before 2007. In 2014 the entire fleet was replaced by dual-mode trolleybuses manufactured by Yutong and Zhongtong Bus. These new trolleybuses are feature air-conditioning, low floor access, leather-covered seats, "maternal-and-child" seats and LED destination signs. In 2017, the first of an order of 70 articulated 18 meter trolleybuses manufactured by Sinotruk started operating.

Expansion 
The Jinan Government has drafted a plan to expand the trolleybus system into a "Three Horizontal Five Vertical" Trolleybus BRT network by 2021. 292 articulated and 443 rigid trolleybuses were ordered to service the expansion. Jinan BRT corridors 1 and 7 will be the first to convert over to trolleybus operation by 2019.

See also

List of trolleybus systems
Transport in the People's Republic of China

References

External links

 
 
 China National Heavy Duty Truck Group (Sinotruk) – official site 

Transport in Jinan
Jinan
Jinan
1977 establishments in China